Acanthaspis siva is a species of assassin bug. Nymphs of this species engage in the camouflaging behavior common to other species of Acanthaspis. In A. siva, camouflaging appears to reduce the chance that a nymph will be cannibalized by its coinstars.

References

Reduviidae
Insects described in 1902